As a small country, local transport in Kuwait is largely road-based with one car for every 2.25 people. Bus services make up Kuwait's entire public transport network. There are seven airports in Kuwait, the largest of which and solely allocated for civil use is Kuwait International Airport. The Gulf Railway is currently under planning in Kuwait. The metro for Kuwait City is currently in the design phase. Kuwait has several maritime ports along the Persian Gulf, the largest port is Mubarak Al Kabeer Port which is currently under construction.

During the First Gulf War, a lot of Kuwait's infrastructure was damaged or destroyed.

Road transport

As a nation with one car per 2.25 people, Kuwait relies heavily on its road network for transportation. The total length of paved and unpaved roads was 6,524 km in 2009. Traffic congestion is common throughout the day, particularly in Kuwait City.

The country's public transport network consists entirely of bus routes. The state-owned Kuwait Public Transportation Company was established in 1962. It runs local bus routes across Kuwait. The main private bus company is CityBus, which operates about 28 routes across the country. Another private bus company, Kuwait Gulf Link Public Transport Services, was started in 2006. It runs local bus routes across Kuwait and longer distance services to neighbouring Arab countries.

Ports and harbors 

Kuwait lies on the Persian Gulf and ports include: Ash Shu'aybah, Ash Shuwaykh, Kuwait, Mina' 'Abd Allah, Mina' al Ahmadi, Mina' Su'ud, and Mubarak Al Kabeer Port.

Mubarak Al Kabeer Port

Under China's Belt and Road Initiative, the Mubarak Al Kabeer Port is part of the first phase of the Silk City project. As of 2021, the Mubarak Al Kabeer Port is currently under construction. In September 2020, it was reported that the port is 53% complete. In March 2021, it was announced that Kuwait and Pakistan will develop linkages between Gwadar Port and Mubarak Al Kabeer Port. In April 2021, the port's first phase was completed (4 berths). As part of Mubarak Al Kabeer Port's development, Bubiyan Island will contain power plants and substations. A 5,000-megawatt power plant has already been built in Subiya, the Subiya power plant is the largest power plant in Kuwait. Mubarak Al Kabeer Port is among Kuwait's largest infrastructure projects in 2021. There is a current road project connecting Mubarak Al Kabeer Port's first phase to the existing road network in Bubiyan Island. Mubarak Al Kabeer Port's fire stations are currently under development. The port is set to be environmentally sustainable.

Merchant marine
total:
38 ships (1000 GT or over) 2,294,233 GT/3,730,776 DWT 
ships by type:
bulk carrier 2, cargo 1, container 6, liquefied gas 5, livestock carrier 4, petroleum tanker 20 
foreign-owned: 1 (Iran 1) 
registered in other countries:29 (Bahrain 3, Comoros 1, Liberia 1, Libya 1, Panama 2, Qatar 7, Saudi Arabia 6, UAE 8) (2005)

Airports

Overview
There are seven airports, the largest of which and solely allocated for civil use is Kuwait International Airport. Kuwait International Airport recently inaugurated two new terminals to cater to Kuwait-based airlines. Moreover, the largest Kuwait International Airport terminal (Terminal 2) is currently under construction and will expand the airport's overall capacity by 25–50 million passengers per year. The new terminal is environmentally sustainable. It is one of the world's largest environment friendly airport projects.

Airports - with paved runways 
Total: 4
over 3,047 m: 1
2,438 to 3,047 m: 2 
1,524 to 2,437 m: 1

Airports - with unpaved runways 
Total: 3
1,524 to 2,437 m: 1
under 914 m: 2 (2005)

Heliports 
12 (2023)

Kuwait-based Airlines 

This is a list of airlines currently operating in Kuwait.

Railways

Overview
The increasing congestion to the country's roads has led to several railway megaprojects in Kuwait.

Gulf Railway
Kuwait City will form one terminus of the Gulf Railway, a  railway network which will run from Kuwait to Oman, via cities across the Persian Gulf. As of 2021, the Gulf Railway project is currently under construction in Kuwait.

Mubarak Al Kabeer Port in Bubiyan Island is part of the Gulf Railway.

Metro

The Kuwait Metropolitan Rapid Transit System Project is a planned four-line metro network which will total 160 km with 69 stations. According to MEED in 2021, the metro project is currently in the design stage. It is now a PPP project under the management of the Kuwait Authority for Partnership Projects (KAPP).  The government will own 10% of the project and raise 50% of the funds through an initial public offer. The remaining 40% will be held by the private developer.

See also 

 Kuwait
 Jazeera Airways
 Wataniya Airways

References

External links